A tjotter is the smallest of the open round Fries sailing ships with a length on the stern not exceeding .

The ship has no roundwood and it has a wide helm. The head of the rudder is usually decorated with a sculpture, sometimes in the form of a bird.

Originally, the tjotter was used in Friesland, a province in the northern part of the Netherlands, for small-scale transport of goods and people at a time when there were few roads. A tjotter with the size  in Friesland is called a "fjouwer-yacht". At the wharf of Pier Piersma, fjouwer-yachts are still commonly built.

External links 
 Shipbuilding "De Helling"
 Website of Pier Piersma

Ship types
Sailboat types
Sailing ships